1995 in Ghana details events of note that happened in Ghana in the year 1995.

Incumbents
 President: Jerry John Rawlings
 Vice President: Kow Nkensen Arkaah
 Chief Justice: Philip Edward Archer then Isaac Kobina Abban

Events

January

February
22nd - Isaac Kobina Abban was appointed Chief Justice by the President Jerry Rawlings

March
6th  - 38th independence anniversary held.

April

May

June

July
1st - Republic day celebrations held across the country.
14th - Jerry John Rawlings and the first lady, Nana Konadu Agyeman Rawlings attend CBI conference in London.

August

September

October

November

December
Annual Farmers' Day celebrations held in all regions of the country.
7th - Presidential and parliamentary elections held.
15th - President Rawlings starts an 11-day visit U.S. to promote investment and trade.

Births

 January 23: Dominic Oduro, footballer
 March 16: Benjamin Fadi, footballer 
 August 15: Isaac Donkor, footballer
 September 16: Paul Quaye, Spanish-born footballer

Deaths
Ephraim Amu, Ghanaian composer, musicologist and teacher (b. 1899)

National holidays
 January 1: New Year's Day
 March 6: Independence Day
 May 1: Labor Day
 December 25: Christmas
 December 26: Boxing day

In addition, several other places observe local holidays, such as the foundation of their town. These are also "special days."

References